Tudu is a suburb of Accra in the Greater Accra Region of Ghana.

Location
Tudu is located within the central business district of Accra.

Education
The Accra Polytechnic and Kinbu Secondary Technical School both located at Kinbu.

References

Populated places in the Greater Accra Region